Byworth may refer to:

 Byworth, a village near Petworth, West Sussex, England
 Christopher Byworth, English Anglican priest, liturgist, theologian, and academic
 Tony Byworth, British journalist